{{DISPLAYTITLE:Janko group J3}}

In the area of modern algebra known as group theory, the Janko group J3 or the Higman-Janko-McKay group HJM is a sporadic simple group of order
   273551719 = 50232960.

History and properties
J3 is one of the 26 Sporadic groups and was predicted by Zvonimir Janko in 1969 as one of two new simple groups having  21+4:A5 as a centralizer of an involution (the other is the Janko group J2). 

In 1982 R. L. Griess showed that J3 cannot be a subquotient of the monster group.  Thus it is one of the 6 sporadic groups called the pariahs.

J3 has an outer automorphism group of order 2 and a  Schur multiplier of order 3, and its triple cover has a unitary 9-dimensional representation over the finite field with 4 elements.  constructed it via an underlying geometry. It has a modular representation of dimension eighteen over the finite field with 9 elements.
It has a complex projective representation of dimension eighteen.

Presentations

In terms of generators a, b, c, and d its automorphism group J3:2 can be presented as

A presentation for J3 in terms of (different) generators a, b, c, d is

Constructions
J3 can be constructed by many different generators. Two from the ATLAS list are 18x18 matrices over the finite field of order 9, with matrix multiplication carried out with finite field arithmetic:

and

Maximal subgroups
 found the 9 conjugacy classes of maximal subgroups of J3 as follows:

 PSL(2,16):2, order 8160
 PSL(2,19), order 3420
 PSL(2,19), conjugate to preceding class in J3:2
 24: (3 × A5), order 2880
 PSL(2,17), order 2448
 (3 × A6):22, order 2160 - normalizer of subgroup of order 3
 32+1+2:8, order 1944 - normalizer of Sylow 3-subgroup
 21+4:A5, order 1920 - centralizer of involution
 22+4: (3 × S3), order 1152

References 

 R. L. Griess, Jr., The Friendly Giant, Inventiones Mathematicae  69 (1982), 1-102. p. 93: proof that J3 is a pariah.
 
Z. Janko, Some new finite simple groups of finite order, 1969  Symposia Mathematica (INDAM, Rome, 1967/68), Vol. 1  pp. 25–64 Academic Press, London, and in The theory of finite groups (Edited by Brauer and Sah) p. 63-64, Benjamin, 1969.

External links
 MathWorld: Janko Groups
 Atlas of Finite Group Representations: J3 version 2
 Atlas of Finite Group Representations: J3 version 3

Sporadic groups